Jaap-se-Hoogte Pass, also known as just Jaap-se-Hoogte, is situated in Mpumalanga province, on the R577, the road between Lydenburg and Roossenekal (South Africa).

Mountain passes of Mpumalanga